One London Place is a high-rise office building in London, Ontario, Canada. Construction of the tower was completed in 1992.

Besides office space, One London Place has a restaurant, fitness center, newsstand, Pristine Auto Detailing car wash, and 382-space underground parking lot.

Amenities 
The building's amenities include a restaurant, fitness centre, news stand, security, Pristine Auto Detailing car wash, shared tenant boardroom, underground parking, and administration & property management office.

There are four interior columns per floor, and eight corner offices per floor. The building has 24 floors with views of the city skyline.

References

External links

Buildings and structures in London, Ontario
Office buildings completed in 1992
1992 establishments in Ontario
Skyscraper office buildings in Canada